The 1996 Arab Cup Winners' Cup was the seventh edition of the Arab Cup Winners' Cup held in Amman, Jordan between 13 – 22 May 1996. The teams represented Arab nations from Africa and Asia.
Olympique Khouribga from Morocco won the final against Al-Faisaly from Jordan.

Group stage
The height teams were drawn into two groups of five. Each group was played on one leg basis. The winners and runners-up of each group advanced to the semi-finals.

Group A

Group B

Knock-out stage

Semi-finals

Final

Winners

External links
Arab Cup Winners' Cup 1996 - rsssf.com

1996
1996 in association football
International association football competitions hosted by Jordan
1996 in Jordanian sport